The Andirilena Cave is a cave located  from Udugama, in the Galle District of Sri Lanka ( from Belihuloya towards Colombo on the Balangoda–Colombo road).

See also 
 Geography of Sri Lanka
 List of caves in Sri Lanka

References 

Caves of Sri Lanka
Landforms of Galle District